Sir Carl Ferdinand Meyer, 1st Baronet (23 December 1851 – 18 December 1922) was a British banker and mining magnate.

Personal life

Meyer was born in Hamburg, Germany, in a Jewish family, the second son of Siegmund Meyer and Elise Rosa, née Hahn, daughter of Reuben Hahn. He became a naturalised British subject in 1877. In 1883 he married Adèle Levis, daughter of Julius Levis of Hampstead by which he had a son Frank Cecil Meyer and a daughter.

Adèle Levis was the subject of the portrait Mrs. Carl Meyer and her Children, 1896, by John Singer Sargent.

Career
Meyer worked at first for the Rothschild family as their chief clerk and negotiator with the De Beers mining group. He then went on to work for De Beers and became deputy chairman of the company. He was also governor of the National Bank of Egypt, and member of the board of numerous other mining companies. He was also a board member of the Hong Kong and Shanghai Bank (HSBC). He was given the title of baronet in 1910.

Meyer had a great interest in the arts, constantly showing support for opera, music and the theatre. In 1909 he donated 70,000 pounds to the Shakespeare National Memorial Theatre, now rebuilt as the Royal Shakespeare Theatre in Stratford-upon-Avon. During World War I, Meyer wrote to The Times  expressing his disapproval of the tactics used by the Germans in the war, including the sinking of the RMS Lusitania, prompted by a suggestion by Sir Arthur Wing Pinero that Britons of German origin should speak out publicly.

Arms

Notes

External links
 Portrait of Carl Meyer, Bridgeman Art Library

1851 births
1922 deaths
Baronets in the Baronetage of the United Kingdom
British bankers
British philanthropists
British mining businesspeople
De Beers people
Jews from Hamburg
Naturalised citizens of the United Kingdom
German emigrants to England
N M Rothschild & Sons people